Exeter is an unincorporated community and coal town located in Wise County, Virginia, United States.

References

Unincorporated communities in Wise County, Virginia
Coal towns in Virginia
Unincorporated communities in Virginia